A moldmaker (mouldmaker in English-speaking countries other than the US) or molder is a skilled tradesperson who fabricates molds for use in casting metal products. 

Moldmakers are generally employed in foundries, where molds are used to cast products from metals such as aluminium and cast iron.

Injection molding 
The term moldmaker may also be used to describe workers employed in fabricating dies and metal moulds for use in injection molding and die-casting, such as in the plastics, rubber or ceramics industries, in which case it is sometimes regarded as a variety of the trade of the toolmaker. The process of manufacturing molds is now often highly automated.

While much of the machining processes involved in mold making use computer-controlled equipment for the actual manufacturing of molds (particularly plastic and rubber injection and transfer). Moldmaking is still a highly skilled trade requiring expertise in manual machining, CNC machining, CNC wire EDM, CNC Ram EDM, surface grinding, hand polishing and more. Because of the high skill and intense labor involved much of the mold making in the US has been outsourced to low wage countries.
The majority of plastic and rubber parts that are in existence today are made using injection or transfer molds, requiring a mold to be manufactured by a moldmaker.

See also 
 Molding (process)

References 

Metalworking occupations

de:Werkzeugmacher